This is a list of members of the Australian Senate from 1914 to 1917. The 5 September 1914 election was a double dissolution called by Prime Minister of Australia Joseph Cook in an attempt to gain control of the Senate. All 75 seats in the House of Representatives, and all 36 seats in the Senate were up for election. The incumbent Commonwealth Liberal Party was defeated by the opposition Australian Labor Party led by Andrew Fisher, who announced with the outbreak of World War I during the campaign that under a Labor Government, Australia would "stand beside the mother country to help and defend her to the last man and the last shilling."

In accordance with section 13 of the Constitution, terms for senators was taken to commence on 1 July 1914. The Senate resolved that in each State the three senators who received the most votes would sit for a six-year term, finishing on 30 June 1920 while the other half would sit for a three-year term, finishing on 30 June 1917.

In September 1916, 24 Labor members of the House of Representatives and the Senate—including Prime Minister Billy Hughes—were expelled for their support of conscription during World War I and later formed the National Labor Party, which merged with the Commonwealth Liberal Party in February 1917 to form the Nationalist Party (Australia).

Notes

References

Members of Australian parliaments by term
20th-century Australian politicians
Australian Senate lists